Harry Mares (December 21, 1938 – August 5, 2018) was an American educator and politician.

Biography 
Mares was born in Racine, Wisconsin. He graduated from St. Catherine's High School in Racine, Wisconsin, in 1958. He received his bachelor's degree in political science, from Loras College and his master's degree in education from Winona State University. He taught social studies and coached football at White Bear Lake High School in White Bear Lake, Minnesota. Mares served on the White Bear Lake City Council and as Mayor of White Bear Lake. From 1995 to 2002, Mares served in the Minnesota House of Representatives as a Republican.

Notes

1938 births
2018 deaths
Politicians from Racine, Wisconsin
People from White Bear Lake, Minnesota
Loras College alumni
Winona State University alumni
Educators from Minnesota
Minnesota city council members
Mayors of places in Minnesota
Republican Party members of the Minnesota House of Representatives